Sevasti is a village and a community of the Katerini municipality. Before the 2011 local government reform it was part of the municipality of Korinos, of which it was a municipal district. The 2011 census recorded 653 residents in the village.

Population
The village was settled by Pontic Greek refugees from Turkey in 1924.

Religion

Unlike other settlements in Greece, Sevasti has, besides Greek Orthodox, two Protestant communities and there is also a temple of the Greek Evangelical Church, that was established in 1924. There is also a community that follows the Greek Apostolic Church of Pentecost.

See also
Korinos
List of settlements in the Pieria regional unit

References

Populated places in Pieria (regional unit)